Covenant School can refer to:
Covenant School (Texas)
The Covenant School (Virginia)

See also
 Covenant Christian School (disambiguation)
 Covenant College (disambiguation)